Tola Showunmi (born 3 July 2000) is an English footballer who plays as a forward for Pittsburgh Riverhounds in the USL Championship.

Career

Early career & College
Showunmi played as a youth player with Boreham Wood and Cheshunt, the latter of which he made eight senior league appearances for in 2017 in both the Ryman League Division One North and the Isthmian League.

In 2018, Showumni moved to the United States to play college soccer at Merrimack College. In two seasons with the Warriors, Showumni made 35 appearances, netted 13 goals and received Northeast Conference first team all-conference honours in 2019. In 2020, he transferred to the University of New Hampshire, where he went on to make 41 appearances, scoring 14 goals and tallying six assists. With the Wildcats, Showumni was voted to the United Soccer Coaches All-America Third Team and claimed the America East Conference Striker of the Year in 2021. He also earned America East All-Conference First Team honors in 2021, and Second Team honors in 2022.

On 12 January 2022, Showumni was selected 88th overall in the 2022 MLS SuperDraft by Atlanta United. However, he went unsigned by the team and instead returned to New Hampshire to continue his time at college.

Professional
On 1 March 2023, Showumni signed with USL Championship club Pittsburgh Riverhounds ahead of their 2023 season. He made his professional debut on 11 March 2023, appearing as a 79th-minute substitute during a 1–1 draw with Birmingham Legion.

References

External links

2000 births
Living people
Association football forwards
Atlanta United FC draft picks
Boreham Wood F.C. players
Cheshunt F.C. players
English expatriate footballers
English expatriate sportspeople in the United States
English footballers
Expatriate soccer players in the United States
Isthmian League players
New Hampshire Wildcats men's soccer players
Pittsburgh Riverhounds SC players
USL Championship players